Hit & Run Holiday is the fifth studio album by industrial disco band My Life with the Thrill Kill Kult. It was originally released in 1995 on Interscope Records. The band describes it as a surf-punk meets Motown sound that tells the story of vixen Krystal Starlust and drifter Apollo.

Recording
Hit & Run Holiday was the band's second album for Interscope. It was recorded and mixed at Starlust Studios, Los Angeles.

Release
Hit & Run Holiday was originally released on Interscope in 1995. It was later reissued on Rykodisc in cardboard box format in 1999.

Touring
The band toured the U.S. in support of the album from October to November 1995. The support acts on the Hit & Run Holiday Tour were Big Stick, Eve's Plum, and Superstar DJ Traci Lords.

Track listing

Credits
 Backing vocals – Arena Rock, Ava Lucious Whyte, Cookie Bo'Kay, Lois Blue
 Bass – Levi Levi
 Co-producer – Carmen Marusich
 Drums – Dick Fury
 Guitar – Buzz McCoy
 Keyboards – Kitty Killdare
 Management – Tony Ferguson
 Producer – Buzz McCoy
 Vocals – Groovie Mann, Jacky Blacque, Cinderella Pussie
 Written by – Buzz McCoy, Groovie Mann

References

External links

1995 albums
My Life with the Thrill Kill Kult albums